The Treasurer of Queensland is the title held by the Cabinet minister who is responsible for the Queensland Treasury, and by extension, all financial matters of the Queensland Government.

List of Queensland treasurers

See also

Politics of Queensland

References

Queensland
 
Queensland-related lists